The 1952 Claxton Shield was the 13th annual Claxton Shield, it was held in Perth, Western Australia. The participants were South Australia, New South Wales, Victoria and Western Australia. The series was won by the home team, Western Australia.

Claxton Shield
Claxton Shield
Claxton Shield
August 1952 sports events in Australia
July 1952 sports events in Australia